George Muiru Manasseh Njuguna  was an Anglican bishop in Kenya during the last quarter of the twentieth century.

Njuguna was educated at St. Paul's University, Limuru and was ordained in 1968. He served in the Diocese of Nakuru. He was Bishop of Mount Kenya South from 1985 to 1995.

References

20th-century Anglican bishops of the Anglican Church of Kenya
Anglican bishops of Mount Kenya South
St. Paul's University, Limuru alumni